Astate: La Malédiction des Templiers is a 1990 adventure game developed by Calypso and published by New-Deal Productions for the Amiga and Atari ST. The game is notable for being a proto Myst-clone, released four years prior to the game being released.

Plot and gameplay
An archeologist is searching the French countryside and Templar ruins to find pieces of a statue.

The point-and-click adventure game has static screens and an icon-based interface. A proto Myst-clone, the game is a purely graphic adventure from the first person perspective, with no subtitles or voice over. The game has many death states, as well as unwinnable states by discarding important items.

Critical reception
ACAR praised the game's graphics, plot, and potential. Amiga Action felt the game was pretty slow and pointless. The Games Machine described the experience as a "fruitless wander", and deemed the experience bizarre due to the game relying on graphics and abandoning text altogether.

References

External links
 ST Format review
 Powerplay review
 Amiga Joker review
 ASM review

1990 video games
Amiga games
Atari ST games
Adventure games
Video games developed in France
Single-player video games